Cevat Şakir Kabaağaçlı (17 April 1890 – 13 October 1973; born Musa Cevat Şakir; pen-name "The Fisherman of Halicarnassus") was a Cretan Turkish writer of novels, short-stories and essays, as well as a keen ethnographer and travel writer.

Early life
Şakir was born in 1890 to the Kabaağaclı family. He was the brother of artists Fahrelnissa Zeid and Aliye Berger, and grew up on Büyükada in İstanbul.

His father, Mehmet Şakir Pasha, was an impoverished military officer who arranged for his son to study at Oxford University. Cevat dropped out and during his voyage back to Turkey married an Italian woman named Anise. In 1914 he shot his father after an argument on their family farm. Cevat said that they were arguing about his wife. He was sentenced to 14 years in jail, but was released after a general amnesty. Following a political offense in 1925, he was exiled for three years to Bodrum and settled there.

Career 
After completing his sentence in Istanbul, he returned to Bodrum where he lived for 25 years, adopting his pen name in homage to Halicarnassus, Bodrum's name in antiquity. He is credited with bringing the fishing and sponge-diving town to the attention of the Turkish intelligentsia and then to the reading public, thereby starting its journey to become a major international tourist attraction. He is credited with inventing the Blue Cruise that has become a feature of Southern Aegean and Mediterranean tourism.

One of his poems about Bodrum is shown on a sign in the city: When you reach the hill, you will see Bodrum. Don't think you'll leave as you came. Others before you thought the same, as they departed they left their soul behind in Bodrum.

In 1950, he took a minor role in a movie, under the screen name Cevat Şakir Kabaağaç.

An erudite and colourful man, Şakir had a great impact on the evolution of intellectual ideas in Turkey during the 20th century.  He was an early environmentalist and many trees that he planted in Bodrum still survive there.

Tributes
On April 17, 2015, Google celebrated his birthday with a Google Doodle.

The story of the Fisherman of Halicarnassus is featured in his sister Shirin Devrim's 1994 book, A Turkish Tapestry: The Shakirs of Istanbul.

Works

Short stories
Ege Kıyılarından (1939) 
Merhaba Akdeniz (1947) 
Ege’nin Dibi (1952) 
Yaşasın Deniz (1954) 
Gülen Ada (1957) 
Ege’den (1972) 
Gençlik Denizlerinde (1973) 
Parmak Damgası (1986) 
Dalgıçlar (1991) 
Gündüzünü Kaybeden Kuş

Novels
Aganta Burina Burinata (1945) 
Ötelerin Çocuğu (1956) 
Uluç Reis (1962) 
Turgut Reis (1966) 
Deniz Gurbetçileri (1969)

Essays
Anadolu Efsaneleri (1954) 
Anadolu Tanrıları (1955) 
Mavi Sürgün (self-biography, 1961) 
Anadolu’nun Sesi (analysis, 1971) 
Hey Koca Yurt (1972) 
Merhaba Anadolu (1980) 
Düşün Yazıları (1981) 
Altıncı Kıta Akdeniz (1982) 
Sonsuzluk Sessiz Büyür (1983) 
Çiçeklerin Düğünü (1991) 
Arşipel (1993)

See also
 Blue Cruise
 Azra Erhat
 Sabahattin Eyüboğlu
 Fahrelnissa Zeid
 Aliye Berger
 Füreya Koral

Footnotes

References
 Who is who database - Biography of Cevat Şakir Kabaağaçlı

1890s births
1973 deaths
Turkish writers
Robert College alumni
Writers from Istanbul
People from Bodrum
Akbaba (periodical) people
Deaths from cancer in Turkey